Wilderich Freiherr Ostman von der Leye (4 June 1923 – 30 May 1990) was a German SPD politician.

Life and career 
Wilderich Freiherr Ostman von der Leye belonged to the Westphalian Ostman von der Leye family. After matriculation, he was a marine from 1941 to 1945. After the War, he studied Law and Medicine from 1946 to 1954. After that, he was a partner in a number of publishing houses.

Political career
Ostman von der Leye joined the SPD in 1957. From 1964 to 1973 he was on the Bonn city council. At the 1969 West German federal election he stood for election and was elected on the party list. He was re-elected in 1972 and remained a member of the Bundestag until the end of the session in 1976. In the Bundestag he sat on the special committee for criminal law reform.

He remained in politics until his death in 1990.

References 

Members of the Bundestag for North Rhine-Westphalia
1923 births
1990 deaths
German military personnel of World War II
Officers Crosses of the Order of Merit of the Federal Republic of Germany
Members of the Bundestag for the Social Democratic Party of Germany